The 11th Pan American Games were held in Havana, Cuba from August 2 to August 18, 1991.

Medals

Gold

Men's 400 metres: Roberto Hernández
Men's 4x100 metres: Leandro Peñalver, Félix Stevens, Jorge Aguilera, and Joel Lamela
Men's 4x400 metres: Héctor Herrera, Agustin Pavó, Jorge Valentin, and Lázaro Martínez
Men's Marathon: Alberto Cuba
Men's High Jump: Javier Sotomayor
Men's Long Jump: Jaime Jefferson
Men's Triple Jump: Yoelbi Quesada
Men's Javelin: Ramón González
Women's 100 metres: Liliana Allen
Women's 200 metres: Liliana Allen
Women's 400 metres: Ana Fidelia Quirot
Women's 800 metres: Ana Fidelia Quirot
Women's 100 m hurdles: Aliuska López
Women's 400 m hurdles: Lency Montelier
Women's High Jump: Ioamnet Quintero
Women's Shot Put: Belsis Laza
Women's Discus: Bárbara Hechevarría
Women's Javelin: Dulce García

Men's Light Flyweight (– 48 kg): Rogelio Marcelo
Men's Flyweight (– 51 kg): José Ramos
Men's Bantamweight (– 54 kg): Enrique Carrion
Men's Featherweight (– 57 kg): Arnaldo Mesa 
Men's Lightweight (– 60 kg): Julio González Valladares 
Men's Welterweight (– 67 kg): Juan Hernández Sierra 
Men's Light Middleweight (– 71 kg): Juan Carlos Lemus 
Men's Middleweight (– 75 kg): Ramón Garbey 
Men's Light Heavyweight (– 81 kg): Orestes Solano 
Men's Heavyweight (– 91 kg): Félix Savón 
Men's Super Heavyweight (+ 91 kg): Roberto Balado

Men's 4.000m Individual Pursuit (Track): Raúl Domínguez
Men's 4.000m Team Pursuit (Track): Cuba 
Men's Team Time Trial (Road): Cuba

Men's 10m Platform: Roger Ramírez

Men's All-Around: Eric López 
Men's Floor Exercise: Damian Merino
Men's Parallel Bars: Eric López 
Men's Pommel Horse: José Tejada 
Men's Rings: Damian Merino
Men's Horizontal Bar: Félix Aguilera
Men's Vault: Eric López 
Men's Team: Cuba 
Women's Balance Beam: Leyanet González 
 

Women's All-Around: Lourdes Medina 
Women's Rope: Lourdes Medina 
Women's Ball: Lourdes Medina 
Women's Clubs: Lourdes Medina 
Women's Group: Cuba

Men's Team Competition: Cuba men's national handball team

Men's 200 m Breaststroke: Mario González

Men's Team Competition: Cuba men's national water polo team

Men's Flyweight (– 52 kg): Héctor Arzola
Men's Bantamweight (– 56 kg): William Vargas
Men's Featherweight (– 60 kg): Pedro Negrín
Men's Lightweight (– 67.5 kg): Víctor Echevarría
Men's Middleweight (– 75 kg): Pablo Lara
Men's Light-Heavyweight (– 82.5 kg): Emilio Lara
Men's Middle-Heavyweight (– 90 kg): Pedro Rodríguez
Men's First-Heavyweight (– 100 kg): Omar Semanat
Men's Heavyweight (– 110 kg): Ernesto Montoya
Men's Super Heavyweight (+ 110 kg): Ernesto Aguero

Men's Freestyle (– 48 kg): Aldo Martínez 
Men's Freestyle (– 52 kg): Carlos Varela 
Men's Freestyle (– 90 kg): Roberto Limonta 
Men's Greco-Roman (– 52 kg): Raúl Francisco Martínez
Men's Greco-Roman (– 57 kg): Amadoris González
Men's Greco-Roman (– 62 kg): Juan Luis Marén
Men's Greco-Roman (– 74 kg): Abel Sarmiento
Men's Greco-Roman (– 82 kg): Alfredo Linares
Men's Greco-Roman (– 100 kg): Héctor Milian

Silver

Men's Recurve (50 m): Miguel León

Men's 10,000 metres: Ángel Rodríguez
Men's 110 m hurdles: Alexis Sánchez
Men's Shot Put: Paul Ruiz
Men's Discus: Roberto Moya
Men's Decathlon: Eugenio Balanqué
Women's Marathon: Maribel Durruty
Women's 100 m hurdles: Odalys Adams
Women's Long Jump: Eloína Echevarría
Women's Discus: Hilda Ramos
Women's 4x100 metres: Liliana Allen, Eusebia Riquelme, Julia Duporty, and Idalmis Bonne
Women's 4x400 metres: Ana Fidelia Quirot, Nancy McLeón, Julia Duporty, and Odalmis Limonta

Women's Team Competition: Cuba women's national basketball team

Men's 1.000m Sprint (Track): D. Hiram 
Men's Individual Race (Road): Heriberto Rodríguez 
Women's Individual Race (Road): Odalys Toms 
Women's Team Time Trial (Road): Cuba

Men's 1m Springboard: Abel Ramírez

Men's All-Around: José Tejada 
Men's Pommel Horse: Félix Aguilera 
Men's Rings: Eric López
Men's Vault: Casimiro Suárez 
Women's Floor Exercise: Dayami Núñez 
Women's Team: Cuba

Women's Hoop: Lourdes Medina 
Women's Team: Cuba

Men's 100 m Backstroke: Rodolfo Falcón

Men's Freestyle (– 57 kg): Alejandro Puerto 
Men's Freestyle (– 82 kg): Orlando Hernández 
Men's Greco-Roman (– 48 kg): Geovani Mato
Men's Greco-Roman (– 68 kg): Cecilio Rodríguez
Men's Greco-Roman (– 90 kg): Reynaldo Peña
Men's Greco-Roman (– 130 kg): Wilfredo Pelayo

Bronze

Men's Recurve Team: Cuba
Women's Recurve Team: Cuba

Men's 200 metres: Félix Stevens
Men's 10,000 metres: Juan Jesús Linares
Men's Marathon: Radamés González
Men's 3,000 m Steeplechase: Juan Ramón Conde
Men's Long Jump: Iván Pedroso
Men's Pole Vault: Ángel García
Men's Discus: Juan Martínez Brito
Men's Hammer: René Díaz
Men's 50 km Walk: Edel Oliva
Women's Marathon: Emperatriz Wilson
Women's Javelin: Herminia Bouza
Women's Heptathlon: Magalys García

Men's 4.000m Points Race (Track): Conrado Cabrera 
Women's 3.000m Individual Pursuit (Track): Tatiana Fernández

Women's 1m Springboard: Mayte Garbey 
Women's 3m Springboard: Mayte Garbey 
Women's 10m Platform: María Carmuza

Men's Team Competition: Cuba national football team

Men's All-Around: Félix Aguilera 
Men's Parallel Bars: Félix Aguilera 
Women's Floor Exercise: Georgina Benítez 
Women's Balance Beam: Odaimis Jiménez

Women's Clubs: Yalili Fung

Men's 200 m Freestyle: René Sáez
Men's 1500 m Freestyle: Pedro Carrío
Men's 4 × 100 m Medley Relay: Cuba

Men's Freestyle (– 62 kg): Lázaro Reinoso 
Men's Freestyle (– 74 kg): Alberto Rodríguez 
Men's Freestyle (– 100 kg): Ángel Anaya 
Men's Freestyle (– 130 kg): Domingo Mesa

Results by event

Basketball

Men's Team Competition
Preliminary Round (Group A)
Lost to United States (88-92)
Defeated Bahamas (99-90)
Lost to Venezuela (70-84)
Lost to Argentina (72-77)
Quarterfinals
Defeated Brazil (96-92)
Semifinals
Lost to Mexico (87-93)
Bronze Medal Match
 Lost to United States (74-93) → 4th place
Team Roster

Women's Team Competition
Preliminary Round
Defeated Argentina (93-47)
Defeated Canada (95-71)
Lost to Brazil (87-90)
Lost to United States (71-91)
Semifinals
Defeated United States (86-81)
Final
Lost to Brazil (76-97) → Silver Medal
Team Roster

Volleyball

Men's Team Competition
Preliminary Round
Defeated Puerto Rico (3-0)
Defeated Canada (3-0)
Defeated Argentina (3-0)
Defeated United States (3-0)
Defeated Brazil (3-1)
Semifinals
Defeated Argentina (3-0)
Final
Defeated Brazil (3-0) → Gold Medal
Team Roster

See also
 Cuba at the 1990 Central American and Caribbean Games
 Cuba at the 1992 Summer Olympics

Nations at the 1991 Pan American Games
P
1991